The 1997 Nippon Professional Baseball season was the 48th season of operation for the league.

Regular season standings

Central League

Pacific League

Japan Series

See also
1997 Major League Baseball season

References

 
1997 in baseball
1997 in Japanese sport